Opinion polling (popularly known as surveys in the Philippines) for the 2010 Philippine presidential election is managed by two major polling firms: Social Weather Stations and Pulse Asia, and several minor polling firms. The polling firms conducted surveys both prior and after the deadline for filing of certificates of candidacies on December 1, 2009.

Post-filing
Note: Tables only include confirmed candidates by the COMELEC.
The following are results of surveys taken after the last day of filing of certificates of candidacies by the candidates (December 1).

Scores in bold indicate first place, scores in italics are within the margin of error of first place.

Presidential election

Vice presidential election

Notes:

Pre-filing
The following are survey results before the deadline of filing of certificates of candidacy.

Note: Figures assigned with "–" refers that the person either wasn't included among the choices or failed to crack the top positions in the poll.

Pulse AsiaPulse Asia: Of the people on this list, whom would you vote for as President of the Philippines if the elections were held today and they were presidential candidates?Notes:
Sample: 1,200, with 300 each for Metro Manila, rest of Luzon, Visayas and Mindanao.
Margin of error: ±3% for national percentages and ±6% for area percentages

Social Weather StationsSocial Weather Stations: Under the present Constitution, the term of Pres. Arroyo is only up to the year 2010, and there will be an election for President in May 2010.  Who in your opinion are the good leaders who should succeed President Arroyo as President?''
Notes:
Participants were allowed to choose up to three persons, hence the numbers would exceed 100%.
Responses below 2% were excluded.
Sample: 1,200, with 300 each for Metro Manila, rest of Luzon, Visayas and Mindanao.
Margin of error: ±3% for national percentages and ±6% for area percentages

Controversy
With the various surveys showing a two-horse race between Noynoy Aquino and Manny Villar, other candidates had expressed doubts on the accuracy of the surveys. Presidential candidate Richard Gordon filed a temporary restraining order before the Quezon City Regional Trial Court, to stop Pulse Asia and SWS from releasing results of pre-election surveys. Gordon said that the research groups used false methodologies and that the 2 survey companies are "stealing the people's minds" and preventing voters from carefully choosing their preferred candidates, particularly those running for president."

References

2010 Philippine general election
2010
Philippines